Ștefania Oana Jipa (born 1 March 2000) is a Romanian handball player for SCM Craiova.

As a junior, she finished fifth in the 2019 Junior European Championship.

References
 

 
  
2000 births
Living people
People from Onești
Romanian female handball players
21st-century Romanian women